Jyothirmayi is an Indian actress, television presenter, and former model, who works in Malayalam cinema. Starting her career as a model, she ventured into television, working as an anchor and later starring numerous Television show.

Career

Jyothirmayi started her career as a model and serial artist and gained recognition for her performance in the Malayalam soap opera, Indraneelam, directed by Suresh Krishnan. After a brief and unsuccessful stint acting in telefilms, she moved to full films. In her first film Pilots (2000), she played a minor character and the film was a box office bomb. She was noticed after the release of Meesa Madhavan (2002) along with actor Dileep. 
In Tamil, she also got offers opposite stars Sathyaraj and Vijayakanth. After rising to fame as an actress, she has worked in nearly 30 Malayalam films.

Personal life

She married Nishanth Kumar on 6 September 2004. Six years later the couple filed for divorce, and it was granted on 1 October 2011. She married film director and cinematographer Amal Neerad on 4 April 2015.

Filmography

Film
 All films in Malayalam otherwise language noted

Television

As actress
 Indhraneelam
 Chithralekha
 Vava (2001)
 Ashtabandhangal
 Aparna
 Avasthantharangal
 Annu Mazhayayirunnu (Telefilm) as Devi
 Arikil Oral Koode (Telefilm) as Maya

As host
 Pepsi Top 10
Your Choice
Vaalkannadi
Kalaalayavarnangal
Samagamam
Vivel Honeymoon Travels

As judge
 Super Dancer 2

Accolades

Kerala State Film Awards
 Kerala State Film Award for Second Best Actress – Bhavam (2002)

National film awards
 National Film Award (Special Mention) – Bhavam (2002)

Kerala state television awards
  Kerala state television award for best actress – Avasthatarangal (2001)
Asianet film awards
 Asianet Award for Best Female New Face of the Year – Meesa Madhavan (2002)

References

External links

Indian film actresses
Living people
Kerala State Film Award winners
21st-century Indian actresses
Actresses in Tamil cinema
Actresses in Telugu cinema
Actresses in Malayalam cinema
Actresses from Kottayam
Indian television actresses
Actresses in Malayalam television
Special Mention (feature film) National Film Award winners
1983 births